Samuel Russell Barr (May 19, 1914 – July 26, 2001) was an American businessman and politician.

Barr was born in Forsyth, Rosebud County, Montana. He graduated from Ortonville High School in Ortonville, Big Stone County, Minnesota. Barr lived in Ortonville, Minnesota with his wife and family and was a n electrical contractor. Barr served in the Minnesota House of Representatives from 1961 to 1972.

References

1914 births
2001 deaths
People from Ortonville, Minnesota
People from Rosebud County, Montana
Businesspeople from Minnesota
Members of the Minnesota House of Representatives